Osmunda × ruggii is a sterile hybrid between Osmundastrum claytonianum and Osmunda regalis var. spectabilis.

References

Efloras - taxon id: Osmunda × ruggii

Osmunda ruggii
Hybrid plants
Ferns of Asia